The Northern Beaches is a region within Northern Sydney, in the state of New South Wales, Australia, near the Pacific coast. This area extends south to the entrance of Port Jackson (Sydney Harbour), west to Middle Harbour and north to the entrance of Broken Bay. The area was formerly inhabited by the Garigal or Caregal people in a region known as Guringai country.

The Northern Beaches district is governed on a local level by the Northern Beaches Council, which was formed in May 2016 from Warringah Council (est. 1906), Manly Council (est. 1877), and Pittwater Council (est. 1992).

History

Early history

The traditional Aboriginal inhabitants of the land now known as the Northern Beaches were the Garigal people of the Eora nation.
Within a few years of European settlement, the Garigal had mostly disappeared from this area mainly due to an outbreak of smallpox in 1789. Much evidence of their habitation remains especially their rock etchings in Ku-ring-gai Chase National Park which borders northern beaches's north-western side. The northern beaches region was explored early on in the settlement of Sydney, only a few weeks after the arrival of the First Fleet. However, it remained a rural area for most of the 19th and early 20th centuries, with only small settlements in the valleys between headlands.

Since those days, urban growth proceeded slowly until the 1960s when development accelerated because of improved roads and a general increase in living standards in the regions.

In 1906, the Warringah Shire council was formed the NSW Government Gazette, along with 132 other new Shires within New South Wales. It ran roughly from Broken Bay in the north to Manly Lagoon to the south, and by Middle Harbour Creek and Cowan Creek in the west. Pittwater was incorporated as the "A Riding" of Warringah Shire, however for many years there existed a sentiment held by some in A Riding, the northern Riding and the largest in Warringah, taking up more than 40% of Warringah's land area, that they were being increasingly ignored and subject to what they considered inappropriate development and policies for their area. This culminated in 1991 when a non-compulsory postal poll of the residents of A Riding was taken over the question of a possible secession. This resulted in a 73.5% vote in favour of secession, however only 48.18% of residents took part in this vote. This vote was, however, 600 short of the total majority required. Over time, the Northern Beaches was often divided by the "Lower Northern Beaches", referring to the southern end of the region, and the "Upper Northern Beaches", referring to the northern end of the region (North Narrabeen to Palm Beach).

In 2016, the Local Government (Council Amalgamations) Proclamation 2016 insisted that the Northern Beaches region councils of Manly, Warringah and Pittwater become the Northern Beaches Council. This was effective from 12 May 2016.

Today, the Northern Beaches is very well part of the Sydney metropolis, however maintains an isolated environment from the other regions of Sydney including the neighbouring North Shore region. The "Forest District" became an unofficial district within the Northern Beaches region to describe the suburbs between Ingleside and the Upper North Shore.

Suburbs and localities
Suburbs
The suburbs of the Northern Beaches district are:

Localities
The localities of the Northern Beaches district are:
 Bantry Bay
 Careel Bay

Schools
The following primary, high and K-12 schools are located on the Northern Beaches:

Primary

AGBU Alexander Primary School
Allambie Heights Public School
Avalon Public School
Balgowlah North Public School
Balgowlah Heights Public School
Beacon Hill Public School
Belrose Public School
Bilgola Plateau Public School
Collaroy Plateau Public School
Cromer Public School
Curl Curl North Public School
Dee Why Public School
Elanora Heights Public School
Farmhouse Montessori Primary School
Forestville Montessori School
Forestville Public School
Frenchs Forest Public School
Harbord Public School
John Colet School
Kamaroi Rudolf Steiner School
Kambora Public School
Killarney Heights Public School
Kinma School
Manly Village Public School
Manly Vale Public School
Manly West Public School
Maria Regina Catholic Primary School
Mimosa Public School
Mona Vale Public School
Narrabeen Lakes Public School
Narrabeen North Public School
Narraweena Public School
Newport Public School
Our Lady of Good Counsel Catholic Primary School
Sacred Heart Catholic Primary School
Seaforth Public School
St Cecilia's Catholic Primary School
St John's Catholic Primary School
St John The Baptist Catholic Primary School
St Joseph's Catholic Primary School
St Kevin's Catholic Primary School
St Kieran's Catholic Primary School
St Luke's Grammar School (Bayview Campus)
St Martin De Porres Catholic Primary School
St Rose Catholic Primary School
Terrey Hills Public School
Wakehurst Public School
Wheeler Heights Public School
Yanginanook School

High

 Barrenjoey High School
 Balgowlah Boys High School
 Cromer High School
 Davidson High School
 Forest High School
 Freshwater Senior Campus
 Killarney Heights High School
 Mackellar Girls Campus
 Manly Selective Campus
 Mater Maria Catholic College
 Narrabeen Sports High School
 Pittwater High School
 Stella Maris College
 St Augustine's College (Years 5-12)
 St Paul's Catholic College

K-12

 Covenant Christian School
Fisher Road School
 Galstaun College
 Northern Beaches Christian School
 Oxford Falls Grammar School
 The Pittwater House Schools
 St Luke's Grammar School (Dee Why Campus)

International Schools

German International School Sydney
Sydney Japanese International School

Closed schools

Beacon Hill High School
 Forestville Montessori High School
 Oxford Falls Public School

Transport 

Public transport in the Northern Beaches is primarily provided by buses. Major bus interchanges are at Pittwater Road at Brookvale, Dee Why, Mona Vale and Manly Wharf. Buses connect to Chatswood and North Sydney stations on the North Shore line, served by Sydney Trains North Shore & Western and Northern services, as well as stations in the CBD.

B-Line buses travel from Mona Vale to Wynyard, stopping at Warriewood, Narrabeen, Collaroy, Dee Why, Brookvale, Manly Vale, Spit Junction and Neutral Bay.

Manly ferry services operated by Sydney Ferries run from Manly to Circular Quay. The privately-operated Manly Fast Ferry also runs to Circular Quay.

Palm Beach Water Airport is located in Palm Beach.

Sports
Notable sports teams include the Manly-Warringah Sea Eagles (rugby league), North Harbour Rays, Manly RUFC, Warringah Rugby Club (rugby union), Manly Warringah District Cricket Club (cricket) and Manly United FC (soccer). The Sea Eagles play in the National Rugby League, and play their home games at Brookvale Oval.

See also
 Manly Beach
 Curl Curl Beach
 Barrenjoey
 Palm Beach
 McKay Reserve

References

External links
 Manly – Local Directory

 
Beaches of New South Wales
Surfing locations in New South Wales
Northern
Lists of tourist attractions in Sydney